"Blue Lights" is a song by English singer and songwriter Jorja Smith. It was released as her debut single on 26 February 2016. The song was written by Smith, Ben Joyce, Guy Bonnet, Roland Romanelli, Dizzee Rascal and Nicholas Detnon and produced by Joyce and Engine Earz. Two years later, it was included on the singer's debut studio album Lost & Found.

The song is built around a sample of "Amour, émoi... et vous" by Guy Bonnet and Roland Romanelli; the lyrics contain interpolations of Dizzie Rascal's "Sirens".

One month after Smith posted "Blue Lights" on her SoundCloud account, the song had more than 400 000 listens. That same week, it was added to the playlists of national British radios. In April 2018, Smith sang "Blue Lights" during her American late-night television debut on Jimmy Kimmel Live!.

A remixed version featuring French rapper Dosseh was released in March 2019.

Charts

Certifications

Awards and nominations

References

External links
 

2016 debut singles
Jorja Smith songs
2016 songs
Songs written by Dizzee Rascal
Songs written by Guy Bonnet
Songs written by Jorja Smith